Cataract is an unincorporated community in Jennings Township, Owen County, in the U.S. state of Indiana.

History
Cataract was platted in 1851. It takes its name from the large waterfalls, or cataract, nearby. A post office was established at Cataract in 1846, and remained in operation until it was discontinued in 1936.

Geography

References

Unincorporated communities in Owen County, Indiana
Unincorporated communities in Indiana